The 77th Regiment of Foot (Montgomerie's Highlanders) was a Highland Scots Regiment raised in 1757. The 77th Regiment was one of the first three Highland Regiments to fight in North America. During the Seven Years' War, the regiment lost 110 soldiers and 259 were wounded.

History
The regiment was raised at Stirling by Major Archibald Montgomerie as the 1st Highland Battalion and ranked as the 62nd Regiment of Foot in 1757. Formed under a plan to increase the loyalty of the Highlanders to the Crown by sending 2,000 Highlanders to fight in North America, the battalion ultimately included thirteen companies with 105 enlisted men each for a total of 1,460 men with 65 sergeants and 30 pipers and drummers. The battalion was drawn from the Montgomery, Stuart, Fraser, MacDonald, Cameron, Maclean, and MacPherson clans. Montgomerie recruited the first ten companies in 1756 and an additional three in 1757.  The first ten companies departed Cork on 30 June 1757 to reinforce the garrison of Charleston, arriving there on 3 September. At Charleston, 200 soldiers who were from the Scottish Lowlands were transferred to the Royal Americans. The three new companies, meanwhile, were sent to Philadelphia and arrived there on 22 April 1758, moving to Carlisle in May. The rest of the battalion was transported to Philadelphia and debarked there on 8 June. The battalion was renamed the 77th Regiment of Foot (Montgomery's Highlanders) in June 1758.

The regiment took part in the Battle of Fort Duquesne on 14 September, 1758, suffering 231 men killed and the capture of their commanding officer, Major James Grant. About 150 survivors later rejoined the main British force under Colonel Henry Bouquet and participated in the capture of Fort Duquesne on 24 November, 1758. In 1760, six companies participated in a campaign against the Cherokee under the command of the regiment's colonel. It sailed for the West Indies in June 1761 and took part in the Invasion of Martinique in January 1762 and the siege of Havana in June 1762. It went on to New York City in October 1762 and saw action at the Battle of Bushy Run in August 1763 after which it was disbanded later in the year.

References

Citations

Bibliography

External links
Lace and colours of the 77th Foot

Infantry regiments of the British Army
Highland regiments
Military units and formations established in 1757
1763 disestablishments in Great Britain
1757 establishments in Scotland
1763 disestablishments in Scotland